Blagg may refer to:

 Blagg (surname), an English surname
 Blagg (crater), a lunar crater